Andrei Alekseevich Shutov (born 4 March 1998) is a Kazakhstani ice hockey player for Barys Astana in the Kontinental Hockey League (KHL) and the Kazakhstani national team.

He represented Kazakhstan at the 2021 IIHF World Championship.

References

External links

1998 births
Living people
Barys Nur-Sultan players
Kazakhstani ice hockey goaltenders
Kazzinc-Torpedo players
Sportspeople from Oskemen